Dhulikhel is a municipality in Kavrepalanchok District of Nepal. Two major highway B.P. Highway and Arniko Highway passes through Dhulikhel. Araniko Highway connects Kathmandu, Nepal's capital city with Tibet's border town of Kodari. Dhulikhel is located at the Eastern rim of Kathmandu Valley, south of the Himalayas at 1550m above sea level and is situated 30 km southeast of Kathmandu and 74 km southwest of Kodari. The Majority of people in Dhulikhel are Newars, and Brahmin, Chhettri, Tamang and Dalit are also living in outer area of the town. Drinking water in Dhulikhel is some of the best water in Nepal. It was made with the help of the German NGO German Technical Cooperation.

Geography 
Located 30 km to the east of Kathmandu valley, Dhulikhel Municipality was established on 2043/11/05 constituting 9 wards. At present, with the expansion of area, the municipality consists of 12 wards covering a total of 54.62 km2.

Dhulikhel Municipality receives an annual rainfall of 1500mm. The average temperature of 20 C makes it a treat for tourists especially in the summer season.

As per the figures of Central Bureau of Statistics Total population of Dhulikhel Municipality is 33,981 with 16,675 male and 17306 female. The population density is 582 per km2. with an average growth rate of 0.65. There are 7039 Households with average size of 4.5.

Dhulikhel Municipality boasts as a major touristic destination with attractions that range from natural scenario to cultural and historical elements. One can view the Himalayan range at an 180o panoramic view of mountains including Mt. Annapurna, Mt. Ganesh Himal, Mt. Langtang, Mt. Phuribichyachu, Mt. Gaurishankar, Mt. Lhotse among others. Other natural attractions include locations like Tundikhel plus cultural and religious sites like Bhagawati, Kalidevi, Gita Mandir, Gaukhureshwor.

History 
The name Dhulikhel is coming from the Nepal Bhasha word Dhali_khela, which is the earlier form of the present Nepal Bhasha name Dhau_khyo. Dhali or Dhau means yogurt and Khela or Khyo means field in Nepala Bhasha. It is said to have come from the Lichchhi name Dhawalasrotapura. Dhulikhel was the eastern border of ancient Nepal Mandala, and it was one of the territories of Bhaktapur kingdom. Dhulikhel was among the last places to be annexed to the country Gorkha that was being expanded by Prithvi Narayan Shah. Yogi Narharinath, in Itihas Prakash writes about the difficulty Prithvi Narayan Shah faced in conquering Dhulikhel. He writes:

"Prithvi Narayan Shah found it difficult to capture Dhulikhel. He got scared by the bravery of the locals. Being unable to conquer the place despite fighting for six months, he installed a fort in the hill above side. Staying there, he gave training and organized numerous forces. This scared the people of vicinity and they started fleeing their homes. Just fifty households remained back in Dhulikhel. Despite this, Mahindra Sing Rai fought valiantly. Prithivi Narayan Shah was frustrated to see yet another defeat when one soldier stabbed Mahindra Sing in the back and roped spear. He died on the spot. His brother, Naamsing also was stabbed with khukuri (cited by Somdhwoj Bista, Shahi sainik Itihaas: 36). In this way, the battle ended and Dhulikhel was won on B.S. 1820 Kartik 10 on Sunday. The next day, Khadpu and Panauti were conquered whereas on Kartik 14 Gorkhalis won Banepa, Sanga and Nala.
Until B.S. 1972, administrative center of Kavrepalanchok was at Chautara. Then, it shifted to Banepa until B.S. 1980 after which it subsequently shifted to Dhulikhel which stands till date.

Educational institutions 
Dhulikhel Municipality has plenty education institutes, including a university, Kathmandu University. The number of basic education schools are 24 and 6 as run by Government and Private Institutions while Secondary Schools number are 11 and 8 respectively. There is also a school run by Monastery in the municipality. Altogether, there are 50 schools in the area. Like the national statistics in favor of literacy rate of men, Dhulikhel Municipality has 85.63% literate male population while the same rate is 65.77% for female, making up for a total literacy rate of 75.26%. School enrollment rate of 99% sees slightly higher rate than the national average of 96%. Of the total 37 early childhood education based establishments, 33 are school based while 4 are community based.

State of residency 
Dhulikhel Municipality has one hospital – Dhulikhel Community Hospital. In addition, there is a Primary Health Center, 6 Health Posts including 3 Urban Health Posts.

81.4%  of the residents of the municipality have access to pipeline water supply, a figure slightly better than the national average of 80%. Among the total households 64.23% (4522 HHs) are equipped with toilet while the remaining 35.76% (2518 HHs).

Residents of Dhulikhel Municipality use a number of sources of fuel for cooking, with traditional source, i.e., Firewood forming the largest chunk, 60.47%. Next are other non-renewable sources of fuel, Kerosene and LP Gas, constituting to 29.84%. Guitha, locally made produce, addresses the need of 5.28% population while the remaining 4.41% use electricity for the cooking purpose. The number of households using improved cooking stoves (ICS) is 1645 (23.37%). This has helped reduce the carbon emission while making the use of the resources efficiently.

There are 4 FM Radios based in Dhulikhel Municipality with a few more frequency also received in the area. The FM in Dhulikhel include Radio Namobuddha, Radio Madhyepurba, Grace FM, and Radio Sheferd.

Regarding the conduction of financial transactions, there are 7 Banks, including all categories of Financial Institutions. The Banks include Nabil Bank, Banijya Bank, Agriculture Bank, Century Bank, Civil Bank, Dev Development Bank and Naya Nepal laghubittya bikas Bank.

Touristic activities 
Dhulikhel Municipality is a major part of the Kathmandu Valley Cultural Trekking Trail. This five-day trail provides a short trek with himalayas in the background and passes showcases a number of cultural highlights and rich biodiversity. Visits to hill stations like Chisapani, Nagarkot along with Dhulikhel will be less challenging than going to himalayas routes but with equal thrill and rewards.
Dhulikhel municipality is one of the starting or the middle points for hiking routes. These include walks to Panauti, Kavre village, Opi village as well as to Hazaar Sindhi all of which take as long as a half day. A longer walking route includes trail to Nagarkot and Namobuddha.
The Municipality also forms one of the points for Mountain Biking with challenging terrains as well as the site of people with rich ethnic culture and the scenery of mountain ranges along the way. Routes include Dhulikhel-Panauti, Dhulikhel-Khopasi, Dhulikhel-Palanchowk-Dhulikhel, Dhulikhel-Namobuddha-Dhulikhel.

One can also do activities like bird and butterfly watching from various points in Dhulikhel Municipality. Hazaar Sindhi stands out as the place, including Thulochaur Kavre, and Gosaikunda forest in the vicinity areas there as many as 72 species of birds (60% residents and 35% migratory) can be sighted.

Dhulikhel has been for centuries an important trading centre on the commercial route linking Nepal to Tibet. Since time immemorial, people of Nepal travel to Tibet to bring home salt and gold. Likewise, the Tibetans every year with their flocks of sheep enter into Nepal during Dashain, the greatest Hindu festival. They use to purchase chilies and other daily necessities in Nepal and return to their homeland. In those days, a whole day walk from Kathmandu to Dhulikhel was comfortable for Tibet trippers with easily available of food and water at Dhulikhel at the evening for overnight stay. After adjoining with Tibet by motorable road in 1965, Dhulikhel got a face lift and developed as a tourist destination. Dhulikhel is an ideal station to stop for overnight stay while going to Tibet and coming back to Kathmandu.

The Mountains The snowfed mountains seen from Dhuklikhel are a fine panoramic. When a blue haze covers the lower portion of the mountains, they seem to be floating in the air. Green inviting hills of which still virgin and some turned into beautifully carved agricultural terraces cater to the beholders' pleasure.
Geographically, the plains rise gradually up to the green mountains and further into the snow-capped Himalayas. The panorama offers a view of the Himalayan ranges stretching from Mount Annapurna in the far west to Mount Karolung in the Far East. More than twenty Himalayan peaks including Mt. Annapurna (8091 m), Mt. Ganesh Himal (7429 m), Mt. Langtang (7234 m), Mt. Phuribichyachu (6637 m), Mt. Gaurishanker (7134 m), Mt. Lhotse (8516 m) and many others can be seen from Dhulikhel.

The Old Town 

The oldest area of the town, the southern end, is an assembly of old Newari houses, often occupied by 20 or more members of the local extended families. Their most valuable assets are the beautifully carved windows and doors, fine examples of traditional Newari craftsmanship. The old town is made up of four toles called wotole(वटोल), etole (ईटोल), dutole (दुटोल), chochhe tole (चोच्छे टोल ).

The narrow streets, are typical of a medieval city inhabited for at least five centuries. The plan of the city is based on ancient Hindu planning doctrine with the position, shape, scale & dominance between buildings, temples, public squares all having their own meaning and harmony. There are organically developed compact settlements around Dhulikhel. One of such old settlements is Shreekhandpur, which lies 2 km west of the core city near the Kathmandu University, and is also a centuries-old Newari and Magar settlement. The settlement is protected by Swet Bhairav (an incarnation of Lord Shiva) and Narayan (Vishnu) deities. Gorkhanath temple also lies here.

Temples 
There are numerous temples in the town depicting traditional and old Newari craftsmanship. These are places of worship for local people. The core area of Dhulikhel has interesting narrow cobbled streets and lanes embedded with number of Hindu Shrines and a few Buddhist Stupa.

In the centre of the old town is the Narayan Temple with its yellow metal roofs. It is dedicated to Lord Krishna whose birthday is celebrated in August. Alongside is the Harisiddhi Temple. Both the temples are adorned with profuse wood carvings and fronted by two Garudas. Bhagwati Temple is situated at the top of the western part of the town. The GaukhureshworMahadev Temple is on the east of the town near Tundikhel Recreation Park. Further up hill, is located the Bhagwati (Kali) Temple, which is a pagoda. Other monuments in dhulikhel are sarswoti temple, dakshinkali, huge statue of lord buddha, bhimsen, balkumari, lankhana mai, tepucha madya, bhairabh nath, bajrayogini, etc.

Vicinity attractions 
 Panauti: It is another historical and culturally rich town located to the south east of Dhulikhel. You can reach Panauti by bus via Banepa or walk there along the trails of Namobuddha or walk along the DBP corridor. The town hosts one of the biggest festivals of Nepal, Makar Mela held every 12 years.
 Namobuddha: A site where a prince sacrificed himself for a hungry and sick tigress, the story is etched in a stone. A visit to Namobuddha means more than just a visit; in addition to hiking for a day, along scenic route witnessing wide range of biodiversity, one can see the lifestyle of the locals.
 Palanchowk Bhagwati: it lies in about half hour ride from Dhulikhel. Palanchowk Bhagwati has shrine of the goddess of the same name, who is 18 armed and is the goddess of protection from danger and misfortune. The temple dates back to 503 AD.
 Chandeshwori Temple: located around 1 km northeast of Banepa, this temple commemorates mother goddess Chandeshwori for defeating demon Chanda. It is also a testament to the power of women, the goddess who defeated the demon and whom no man could kill thanks to the boon accorded him by Lord Shiva.
 Nala: Being one of the seven villages established by Ari Malla about 700 years ago, Nala boasts of temples of Karunamai Lokeshwor and Bhagawati. Located 4 km north west of Banepa, the valley is fertile and produces a number of vegetables. It can be reached from Dhulikhel through Gosaikunda Hill, Opi village and Sumara.
 Sanga: Deriving from local language meaning village of cows, Sanga is gateway to Kavrepalanchowk district. It now has a massive statue (143 ft tall) of Lord Shiva.

Media 
To promote local culture Dhulikhel has one FM radio station Radio Madhyapurba F.M. – 104 MHz Which is a Community radio Station.

Gallery

See also 
 Dhulikhel Hospital
 Kathmandu University

References

External links 

 

Populated places in Kavrepalanchok District
Municipalities in Bagmati Province
Nepal municipalities established in 1986